Vernon Dean Smith (October 23, 1958 – July 7, 1992) was an American professional basketball player.

Playing career 
Smith attended David W. Carter High School in his hometown of Dallas, Texas. He played college basketball for the Texas A&M Aggies, where he was an All-SWC selection every season he played. Smith ranks second in total points scored for the Aggies. Smith was selected by the Philadelphia 76ers as the 46th overall pick in the 1981 NBA draft but never played in the National Basketball Association (NBA). Instead, Smith spent one season with multiple teams in the Continental Basketball Association (CBA) before playing in Italy and Spain. In February 1982, Smith signed a 10-day contract with the Detroit Pistons but never played with the team. In October 1982, Smith was signed by the Indiana Pacers but was released later that month before the start of the 1982–83 NBA season.

Later life and death
After playing his final season in 1986–87 with CEB Llíria, Smith returned to his hometown of Dallas, Texas. He worked as a clerk at Sears and was a church organist.

Smith was fatally shot in a case of mistaken identity. He had been sitting in his car outside an Oak Cliff apartment block when a man, who had argued with a dice game opponent moments earlier, approached Smith and shot him.

Smith was inducted to the Texas A&M Athletic Hall of Fame in 2008.

Career statistics

College

|-
| style="text-align:left;"| 1977–78
| style="text-align:left;"| Texas A&M
| 27 || – || 28.4 || .469 || – || .609 || 8.4 || .9 || .6 || .4 || 14.0
|-
| style="text-align:left;"| 1978–79
| style="text-align:left;"| Texas A&M
| 33 || – || 35.5 || .479 || – || .698 || 8.2 || 2.3 || 1.2 || .4 || 16.0
|-
| style="text-align:left;"| 1979–80
| style="text-align:left;"| Texas A&M
| 32 || – || 34.5 || .472 || – || .744 || 7.5 || 1.3 || .5 || .4 || 14.8
|-
| style="text-align:left;"| 1980–81
| style="text-align:left;"| Texas A&M
| 27 || – || 34.4 || .448 || – || .729 || 9.0 || 2.1 || .8 || .4 || 14.8
|- class="sortbottom"
| style="text-align:center;" colspan="2"| Career
| 119 || – || 33.4 || .468 || – || .699 || 8.2 || 1.7 || .8 || .4 || 14.9

Notes

References

External links
College statistics

1958 births
1992 deaths
1992 murders in the United States
Albany Patroons players
American expatriate basketball people in Italy
American expatriate basketball people in Spain
American men's basketball players
Basketball players from Dallas
Deaths by firearm in Texas
Las Vegas Silvers players
Male murder victims
Murdered African-American people
People murdered in Texas
Philadelphia 76ers draft picks
Power forwards (basketball)
RCD Espanyol Bàsquet players
Texas A&M Aggies men's basketball players
Wisconsin Flyers players